Jean-Luc Grand-Pierre (born February 2, 1977) is a Canadian former professional ice hockey defenceman and current studio analyst for the Columbus Blue Jackets on Bally Sports Ohio.

He was drafted in the seventh round, 179th overall, by the St. Louis Blues in the 1995 NHL Entry Draft. He once won the Speed Skating competition of the AHL All-Star Game, beating Martin St. Louis among others.

Career
After playing four seasons in the Quebec Major Junior Hockey League, Grand-Pierre made his professional debut in the American Hockey League with the Rochester Americans during the 1997–98 season, recording ten points and 211 penalty minutes in 75 games. During the 1998–99 season, he made his NHL debut with the Buffalo Sabres, appearing in 16 games.

After once again spending part of the season with the Sabres in 1999–2000, Grand-Pierre was traded to the Columbus Blue Jackets during the 2000 NHL Expansion Draft. Grand-Pierre spent three full seasons with Columbus before splitting the 2003–04 season between the Blue Jackets, Atlanta Thrashers, and Washington Capitals. In his NHL career, Grand-Pierre appeared in 269 games, scoring seven goals and 13 assists.

Grand-Pierre spent the 2005–06 season with the Füchse Duisburg of Germany's Deutsche Eishockey Liga before joining the DEG Metro Stars for the 2006–07 season. He then signed with the New Jersey Devils of the National Hockey League for the 2007–08 season, spending the entire season with the Devils' AHL affiliate, the Lowell Devils. In 2008, he returned to Duisburg. On July 20, 2009, it was announced that he had signed a one-year deal with Leksands IF of the Swedish second tier league HockeyAllsvenskan (Swe-1). He was loaned out to Stjernen of the Norwegian GET-ligaen for 10 matches in the fall of 2009.

Grand-Pierre was rented by the Finnish SM-liiga team TPS prior to the 2010–11 season, for taxation reasons. He played for the team until October 15, 2010.

Grand-Pierre was released from the Leksands IF organization on September 1, 2011. Subsequently, he signed a one-year contract with the Swe-1 team Malmö Redhawks on October 4, 2011.

Personal life
Grand-Pierre, of Haitian descent, is a cousin of Georges Laraque and QMJHL-player Jules-Edy Laraque. He is a licensed real estate agent in the state of Ohio, and currently works for HER Real Living and The Raines Group.

Grand-Pierre joined Top Shelf Hockey Club (TSHC) as a goalie in 2017. He led Top Shelf to a championship in the winter of 2017.

Career statistics

References

External links

1977 births
Living people
Atlanta Thrashers players
Beauport Harfangs players
Black Canadian ice hockey players
Buffalo Sabres players
Canadian ice hockey defencemen
Canadian sportspeople of Haitian descent
Columbus Blue Jackets announcers
Columbus Blue Jackets players
DEG Metro Stars players
Füchse Duisburg players
Haitian Quebecers
HC TPS players
Ice hockey people from Montreal
IF Troja/Ljungby players
Karlskrona HK players
Leksands IF players
Lowell Devils players
Malmö Redhawks players
Rochester Americans players
St. Louis Blues draft picks
Stjernen Hockey players
Syracuse Crunch players
Val-d'Or Foreurs players
Washington Capitals players
Canadian expatriate ice hockey players in Norway
Canadian expatriate ice hockey players in Germany
Canadian expatriate ice hockey players in Sweden